Jorge Padilla Soler (born 23 April 2001) is a Spanish footballer who plays as a forward for Racing de Ferrol, on loan from CD Tenerife.

Club career
Born in Puerto del Rosario, Fuerteventura, Las Palmas, Canary Islands, Padilla joined CD Tenerife's youth setup from CD La Oliva. On 22 November 2019, before even appearing with the reserves, he featured for the first team as an unused substitute in a 2–0 away defeat of Sporting de Gijón.

Padilla made his professional debut on 30 November 2019, replacing Dani Gómez in a 1–3 home loss against UD Almería. He scored his first senior goal on 17 December, netting the opener in a 3–0 away win against CD Mensajero, for the season's Copa del Rey.

Padilla scored his first professional goal on 4 January 2020, netting the opener in a 4–2 home defeat of Albacete Balompié. On 3 June, he extended his contract until 2025.

On 26 August 2021, Padilla moved to Levante UD on a one-year loan deal, and was assigned to the reserves in Segunda División RFEF. On 31 August of the following year, he moved to Primera Federación side Racing de Ferrol also in a temporary deal.

References

External links

2001 births
Living people
People from Fuerteventura
Sportspeople from the Province of Las Palmas
Spanish footballers
Footballers from the Canary Islands
Association football forwards
Segunda División players
Primera Federación players
Segunda Federación players
Tercera División players
CD Tenerife players
CD Tenerife B players
Atlético Levante UD players
Racing de Ferrol footballers